A. K. C. Sundaravel was an Indian politician belonging to Amma Makkal Munnetra Kazhagam. He was elected as a member of Tamil Nadu Legislative Assembly in 1991. He died by road accident on 6 April 2019 at the age of 70.

References

2019 deaths
Amma Makkal Munnetra Kazhagam politicians
Members of the Tamil Nadu Legislative Assembly